The Holy League of 1571 was arranged by Pope Pius V and included the major Catholic powers of southern Europe (Iberian Peninsula and Italian Peninsula), specifically the Spanish Empire as well as the Italian maritime powers.
It was intended to break the Ottoman Empire’s control of the eastern Mediterranean Sea and was formally concluded on 25 May 1571. Its members were:
 the Papal States under Pius V,
 Spanish Empire under Philip II (including Naples and Sicily),
 the Republic of Venice,
 the Republic of Genoa,
 the Knights of Malta,
 the Grand Duchy of Tuscany and the Order of Saint Stephen under Cosimo I de' Medici,
 the  Duchy of Savoy under Emmanuel Philibert,
 the Duchy of Urbino under Guidobaldo II della Rovere,
 the Duchy of Parma under Ottavio Farnese.

These Christian states were to have a force of 200 galleys, 100 other ships, 50,000 infantry, 4,500 cavalry and adequate artillery ready by 1 April each year. John of Austria, illegitimate half-brother of King Philip II of Spain, was designated supreme commander.
The League kept membership open for the Holy Roman Empire, France and Portugal, but none of them joined. The Empire preferred to maintain its truce with Istanbul, while France had an active anti-Spanish alliance with the Ottomans. Portugal had no forces to spare, owing to its heavy engagement in its own Moroccan campaign, its ongoing maritime confrontations with the Ottomans in the Red Sea and the Indian Ocean, and colonial conflicts with the Malaccan and Johorean Sultanates.

The League initially assembled a fleet to aid the Venetian defenders of Cyprus which was invaded by Ottoman forces under the command of Lala Mustafa in July 1570, but was too late to prevent the island's capture by the Ottomans.

On 7 October 1571, the League won a decisive victory over the Ottoman fleet at the Battle of Lepanto in the Gulf of Patras.
The fleet of the Holy League in this engagement consisted of 212 warships (206 galleys and 6 galleasses, the modern large galleys developed by Venice) with 1,815 guns and carrying 28,500 infantry soldiers. The majority of warships were Venetian (6 galleasses, 109 galleys), the next largest contingent were Spanish (49 galleys, including 26 galleys from Naples, Sicily and other Italian territories), and Genoese (27 galleys), with additional warships from the Papal States (seven galleys), the Order of Saint Stephen from the Grand Duchy of Tuscany (five galleys),  the Duchy of Savoy and the Knights of Malta (three galleys each), and some privately owned galleys in Spanish service.

The victory at Lepanto confirmed the de facto division of the Mediterranean, with the eastern half under firm Ottoman control and the western half under the Habsburgs and their Italian allies.

The following year, as the allied Christian fleet resumed operations, it faced a renewed Ottoman navy of 200 vessels under Kılıç Ali Pasha, but the Ottoman commander actively avoided engaging the allied fleet and headed for the safety of the fortress of Modon. The arrival of the Spanish squadron of 55 ships evened the numbers on both sides and opened the opportunity for a decisive blow, but friction among the Christian leaders and the reluctance of Don John squandered the opportunity. the holy league attempted to capture Navarino but failed.

Pius V died on 1 May 1572.  The diverging interests of the League members began to show, and the alliance began to unravel.
In 1573, the Holy League fleet failed to sail altogether; instead, Don John attacked and took Tunis, only for it to be retaken by the Ottomans in 1574.   Venice, fearing the loss of her Dalmatian possessions and a possible invasion of Friuli, and eager to cut her losses and resume the trade with the Ottoman Empire, initiated unilateral negotiations with the Porte.
The Holy League was disbanded with the peace treaty of 7 March 1573, which concluded the War of Cyprus.

See also
 Holy League of Pope Clement VIII
 Great Siege of Malta
 Ottoman–Venetian War (1570–73)
 Battle of Lepanto order of battle

References

 Loretta Turner Johnson, The Holy League of 1571: The Diplomatic Background of the Battle of Lepanto (1969).
 Luis Coloma, The Story of Don John of Austria, trans. Lady Moreton, (New York: John Lane Company, 1912), pp. 265–71 (online transcription).
 Braudel, Fernand,  trans. Siân Reynolds,  The Mediterranean and the Mediterranean World in the Age of Philip II, 2 volumes, London: Collins (1972/3).

External links
 Robert Wilde, Holy Leagues Of The 16th Century about.com (2001).

1571 establishments in Europe
1573 disestablishments
16th-century military alliances
1571 in Italy
Ottoman–Venetian War (1570–1573)
Pope Pius V
Holy Leagues